The Division of Northern Territory was an Australian Electoral Division in the Northern Territory for the Parliament of Australia. Throughout its existence, it was the only Division in the Northern Territory. At the redistribution of 21 December 2000, the Division was divided into two new divisions, which were named the Division of Solomon, which covered the area immediately around Darwin, and the Division of Lingiari, which covered the remainder of the territory.

History
Until 1911, the Northern Territory was a part of South Australia and from 1890 was represented in the South Australian House of Assembly by two members from the Electoral district of Northern Territory. In 1911, however, the Northern Territory was transferred to the Commonwealth government, which also had the effect of depriving Territorians of all political representation. The first Commonwealth census held in 1911 disclosed the Territory had a non-Aboriginal population of 3,271, comprising 2,673 males and 598 females.

In 1922, the Northern Territory Representation Act 1922 was passed by the Australian Parliament to give the Territory a single non-voting member in the House of Representatives.

The federal Division of Northern Territory was first contested at the 1922 federal election. Its first member was Harold George Nelson, who had led the agitation which unseated the Administrator in 1918. In 1927, the Northern Territory was split into the separate territories of Central Australia and North Australia; there remained only one electoral division and the split was reversed in 1931. Before 1968, the Member for Northern Territory did not have full voting rights, and did not count for the purposes of forming government.  Between 1922 and 1936, he could speak in the House and take part in committee work, but could not vote. Between 1936 and 1959 he was only able to veto motions to disallow laws made for the Territory, and between 1959 and 1968, he could only vote on matters relating to the Territory alone. In 1968, the Member for Northern Territory acquired full voting rights.

The Division of Northern Territory was divided on 21 December 2000 into two new divisions – Solomon, which covered the Darwin area, and the Lingiari, which covers the remainder of the Territory – with Warren Snowdon, the last member for the united division, transferring to Lingiari.

On 19 February 2003, the new Divisions were nominally abolished and the Territory returned to a single Division, but on 28 April 2004 the Commonwealth Electoral Amendment (Representation in the House of Representatives) Act 2004 passed by the Australian Parliament had the effect of leaving the Northern Territory divided into two Divisions.

Members

Election results

References

External links

Northern Territory